The dwarf codling (Notophycis marginata), is a species of morid cod found on the continental slopes in the southeast Pacific and the southwest Atlantic, where it is found down to .

References

 

Moridae
Fish described in 1878
Taxa named by Albert Günther